Neil John MacRae (born 25 March 1972) is a Scottish international cricketer who played two One Day Internationals in 2006. He has also played in first-class and List A cricket matches for Scotland.

MacRae was born at Liverpool. He was appointed coach of the Jersey national cricket team in December 2013 (with his contract beginning in January 2014), with an additional role as high performance coach with the Jersey Cricket Board.

References

1972 births
Living people
Scottish cricketers
Scotland One Day International cricketers
Cricketers from Liverpool
Scottish cricket coaches